Diamond Sports Stadium (also known as Bennett Field at Adelaide Shores) is a 5,000 capacity baseball stadium located in West Beach, South Australia. The stadium is the venue of the Adelaide Giants who play in the Australian Baseball League. The stadium is located at Barratt Reserve on West Beach Road adjacent to the Adelaide International Airport.

History
Prior to becoming the home of the Adelaide Bite for the 2016–17 Australian Baseball League season following their move from baseball's long time home of Norwood Oval due to renovations to the oval, the Diamond Sports Complex was and is the home to the Softball SA and is also the home to Baseball SA.

The venue received a AU$4 million grant from the Government of South Australia in 2016 which enabled Diamond Sports SA to upgrade the main baseball venue to Australian Baseball League standards.

Facilities
The complex includes the 5,000 seat main baseball stadium, 2 fully skinned softball diamonds with playing surface levels of Australian National Softball standard, and a 900 sqm indoor training facility as well as a multipurpose baseball/softball diamond.

Dimensions
Left Field - 
Center Field - 
Right Field -

References 

Sports venues in Adelaide
Baseball venues in Australia